Gold Digger is a comic book series, written and drawn by Fred Perry, and published by Antarctic Press. Counting all the regular series issues, in addition to all the connected limited series, annuals, special issues, and handbooks produced by the author, Gold Digger is the most extensive, long-running, self-contained North American comic book in history that has been consistently written and drawn by the original creator.

The artwork and design of Gold Digger are strongly influenced by Japanese manga, and Perry himself describes the book as a mixture of Indiana Jones and Final Fantasy.

Publication history 
Perry came up with the initial inspiration for Gold Digger during his tour of duty in the First Gulf War, and released the debut one-shot in Antarctic Press' Mangazine in 1991. A four-issue limited series followed in 1992 and 1993, followed by a regular monthly black-and-white series, and finally the current color series beginning in 1999.

In 2011, Perry discussed being inspired by the way the contemporary Doctor Who television series develops story arcs, and he adapted Gold Digger to a similar consistently self-contained format from issue #101 and onwards, with each issue easily accessible and possible to enjoy for new readers.

Summary 
Gold Digger focuses on the adventures of Gina Babette Diggers, polymath superscientist, archeologist, teacher, adventurer, nerd, and idealist extraordinaire, accompanied by her colourful extended family, friends, students, and acquaintances, as she explores the strange and ancient hidden histories of the world, spanning a wide distinctive variety of characters, stories, environments, worlds, societies, times, species, and universes of magic and science fiction, in a world filled with possibilities.

Plot influences 
Thanks to the author's very diverse interests, and personal experiences ranging from the U.S. Marine Corps to physics studies, the stories have included tongue-in-cheek references to a wide variety of popular culture, spanning anything from science, fantasy, science-fiction, television series, books, superheroes, computer games, animation, manga, or even internet memes.

Characters 
See: List of Gold Digger characters

Collected editions
Gold Digger Pocket Manga, vol. 1 – Collects the original miniseries issues #1–4. – 
Gold Digger Pocket Manga, vol. 2 – Collects the first issues of the Gold Digger regular series. – 
Gold Digger Pocket Manga, vol. 3 – 
Gold Digger Pocket Manga, vol. 4 – 
Gold Digger Pocket Manga, vol. 5 – Collects vol. 2 #17–21. – 
Gold Digger Pocket Manga, vol. 6
Gold Digger Pocket Manga, vol. 7 – 
Gold Digger Pocket Manga, vol. 8 – Collects vol. 2 #32–35 plus Ninja High School #54–57. – 
Gold Digger Pocket Manga, vol. 9 – Collects vol. 2 #36–40.
Gold Digger Pocket Manga, vol. 10 – Collects vol. 2 #41–45. – 
Gold Digger Pocket Manga, vol. 11 – Collects vol. 2 #46–50.
Gold Digger Max Pocket Manga – Collects the Asrial vs. Cheetah and A Science Affair miniseries, plus the Gold Digger Beta and GD Minus 18 one-shots. – 
Gold Digger II Pocket Manga, vol. 1 – Collects issues #1–8 of the colour series. – 
Gold Digger II Pocket Manga, vol. 2 – Collects vol. 3 #9–15. – 
Gold Digger II Pocket Manga, vol. 3 – Collects vol. 3 #16–21. – 
Gold Digger II Pocket Manga, vol. 4 – Collects vol. 3 #23–30. – 
Gold Digger II Pocket Manga, vol. 5 – Collects vol. 3 #31–36. – 
Gold Digger II Pocket Manga, vol. 6 – Collects vol. 3 #37–42. – 
Gold Digger II Pocket Manga, vol. 7 – Collects vol. 3 #43–47. – 
Gold Digger II Pocket Manga, vol. 8 – Collects vol. 3 #48–52. – 
Gold Digger II Pocket Manga, vol. 9 – Collects vol. 3 #52–56. – 
Gold Digger II Pocket Manga, vol. 10 – Collects vol. 3 #57–61. – 
Gold Brick, vol. I – Collects vol. 2 #1–25
Gold Brick, vol. II – Collects vol. 2 #25–50 
Gold Brick, vol. III – Collects vol. 3 #1–25 (51–75 overall) – 
Gold Brick, vol. IV – Collects vol. 3 #26–50 (76–100 overall) – 
Gold Brick, vol. V – Collects vol. 3 #51–75 (101–125 overall) – 
Gold Brick, vol. VI – Collects vol. 3 #76–100 (126–150 overall) – 
Gold Brick, vol. VII – Collects vol. 3 #101–125 (151–175 overall) – 
Gold Brick, vol. VIII – Collects vol. 3 #126–150 (176–200 overall) – 
Gold Brick, vol. IX – Collects vol. 3 #151–175 (201–225 overall) – 
Gold Digger Platinum, vol. 1 – Collects vol. 3 #101–105. Starring Gina and her new batch of supernatural archeology students. – 
Gold Digger Platinum, vol. 2 – Collects vol. 3 #106–110.
Peebo Manga Vol. 1 – Starring Brianna, Peebri, and the Peebos.
Peebo Tales TPB – Collects "Gold Digger: Peebo Tales #1–6".
Tifanny & Charlotte Pocket Manga – Collects the first miniseries.
Tifanny & Charlotte, 2nd Semester Pocket Manga – Collects the second miniseries.
Throne of Shadows Pocket Manga – Collects "Throne of Shadows" #1–4, starring the wererats.
Maidens of Twilight Pocket Manga – Starring Gennadrid and Seance.
Gold Digger Tangent Pocket Manga – Starring Ayane and the Northern Edge Guard.
Gold Digger Sourcebook TPB – Collects the Gold Digger Sourcebook #1–17.
Gold Digger Tech Manual – Collects Gold Digger Tech Manual #1–9

DVDs
GD-ROM 1.0 – Collects Gold Digger vol.1: #1–4, vol.2: #1–50, vol.3: #1–75, and Ninja High School #54–57.
GD-ROM 2.0 – Collects Gold Digger vol.1: #1–4, vol.2: #1–50, vol.3: #1–100, and Ninja High School #54–57.
GD-ROM 3.0 – Collects Gold Digger vol.1: #1–4, vol.2: #1–50, vol.3: #1–125, and Ninja High School #54–57.
Gold Digger: Time Raft – A full length OVA movie.

Awards 
In 2013, Perry received an Inkpot Award for his work on the series.

External links
Fred Perry's Deviantart profile page – Contains drawings, news, and comic strips.
Antarctic Press page – Publisher of the Gold Digger series, collections and spinoffs, with an online store for ordering collections and back issues.
Antarctic Press Library – Official free online celebration preview of the 199 first Gold Digger issues.
GD Tangent – A webcomic by Fred Perry featuring drawings of various Gold Digger characters, Lvlup, set in Vana'diel (the world of Final Fantasy XI), and two Gold Digger subcomics, Ayane, set on Earth, and Northern Edge, set in the world of Jade.

References

Original English-language manga
Feminist comics
Comics about women
Fictional archaeologists
1992 comics debuts